The Mining League (last sponsored by One and All Sports) was a football league competition based in Cornwall, England, UK, with three divisions. The First Division sat at level 13 of the English football league system, and the winning team could be promoted to the Cornwall Combination.

The league merged with the Falmouth & Helston League at the end of the 2010–11 season. Both leagues at the time of the merger had three divisions and had 45 teams. The new Trelawny League was introduced for the start of the 2011–12 season, once the Falmouth & Helston League celebrated its 50th anniversary.

Events
In 2010 the league made the national news due to the performances of newly promoted Division One team Madron, who conceded 227 goals in their first 11 games of the season, including a 55–0 defeat to Illogan RBL Reserves. Madron finished the season with no points and a goal difference of –395.

Recent champions
These are the divisional champions for the final seasons of the league:

Division One
2009–10: Illogan Reserves
2010–11: Illogan Reserves

Division Two
2009–10: Madron
2010–11: Carbis Bay United

Division Three
2008-09: Threemilestone Reserves
2009–10: Praze-an-Beeble
2010–11: Hayle IV

References

External links

Mining League results and tables @ TheFA.com

Football leagues in Cornwall
Defunct football leagues in England